Heyburn may refer to:
 Weldon Heyburn (1910–1951), American film actor
 Weldon B. Heyburn, United States Senator from Idaho from 1903 until 1912
Weldon Brinton Heyburn, Pennsylvania State Senator from 1937 to 1949
 Heyburn, Idaho, small town named after Weldon B. Heyburn
 Mount Heyburn, a mountain in Idaho named after Weldon B. Heyburn
 John G. Heyburn II (1948–2015), United States District Court Judge

See also 
 Heyburn Building, a 17-floor, 250-foot (76-m) building in downtown Louisville, Kentucky, United States
 Heyburn State Park, an Idaho state park in Benewah County, Idaho in the United States
 Heyburn Lake, a reservoir on Polecat Creek in Creek County, Oklahoma